Midkiff is a T-shaped unincorporated desert village in northeastern Upton County, Texas, United States.  It lies along RM 2401 and FM 3095 north of the city of Rankin, the county seat of Upton County.  Its elevation is 2,736 feet (834 m).  It has a post office, serving the ZIP code of 79755; the ZCTA for ZIP Code 79755 had a population of 245 at the 2000 census.

Founded in an oil boom in the early 1950s, Midkiff was named for a former community in nearby Midland County. Its original proposed name was "Hadacol Corner", but the U.S. Postal Service objected, presumably because it disapproved of locating in a town named after a registered corporate brand name, and the founders agreed to make a change in order to have a post office.  Its post office was established in September 1952.

Climate
According to the Köppen climate classification, Midkiff has a semiarid climate, BSk on climate maps.

References

External links
Profile of Midkiff from the Handbook of Texas Online

Unincorporated communities in Upton County, Texas
Unincorporated communities in Texas